Carrier current transmission, originally called wired wireless, employs guided low-power radio-frequency signals, which are transmitted along electrical conductors. The transmissions are picked up by receivers that are either connected to the conductors, or a short distance from them. Carrier current transmission is used to send audio and telemetry to selected locations, and also for low-power broadcasting that covers a small geographical area, such as a college campus. The most common form of carrier current uses longwave or medium wave AM radio signals that are sent through existing electrical wiring, although other conductors can be used, such as telephone lines.

Technology 
Carrier current generally uses low-power transmissions. In cases where the signals are being carried over electrical wires, special preparations must be made for distant transmissions, as the signals cannot pass through standard utility transformers. Signals can bridge transformers if the utility company has installed high-pass filters, which typically has already been done when carrier current-based data systems are in operation. Signals can also be impressed onto the neutral leg of the three-phase electric power system, a practice known as "neutral loading", in order to reduce or eliminate mains hum (60 hertz in North American installations), and to extend effective transmission line distance.

For a broadcasting installation, a typical carrier current transmitter has an output in the range 5 to 30 watts. However, electrical wiring is a very inefficient antenna, and this results in a transmitted effective radiated power of less than one watt, and the distance over which signals can be picked up is usually less than 60 meters (200 feet) from the wires. Transmission sound quality can be good, although it sometimes includes the low-frequency mains hum interference produced by the alternating current. However, not all listeners notice this hum, nor is it reproduced well by all receivers.

Extensive systems can include multiple unit installations with linear amplifiers and splitters to increase the coupling points to a large electrical grid (whether a campus, a high-rise apartment or a community). These systems would typically require coaxial cable interconnection from a transmitter to the linear amplifiers. In the 1990s, LPB, Inc., possibly the largest manufacturer of these transmission systems, designed and supplied several extensive campus-based systems that included fiber-optic links between linear amplifiers to prevent heterodyne interference.

Initial development
The ability for electrical conductors to act as waveguides for radio signals was noted in the earliest days of radio experimentation, and Heinrich Hertz published the first review of the phenomenon in 1889. By 1911, Major General George Owen Squier was conducting some of the earliest studies designed to put carrier current transmissions, which he called "wired wireless", to practical use. To be effective, the radio transmitter must be capable of generating pure continuous-wave AM transmissions. Thus, the technology needed to set up carrier current transmissions would not be readily available until the late 1910s, with the development of vacuum tube transmitters and amplifiers.

Long-distance communication

The first commercial applications of carrier current technology included the setting up of long-distance telegraph, telemetry, and telephone communication by electrical companies over their high-voltage distribution lines. This approach had a major advantage over standard telegraph and telephone lines, because radio signals can readily jump over any small gaps in cases when there is a line break. In May 1918, the Imperial Japanese Electro-Technical Laboratory of Tokyo successfully tested "wave telephony" over the Kinogawa Hydro-Electric Company's 144-kilometer (90-mile) long power line. In the summer of 1920, a successful test transmission over 19.2 kilometers (12 miles) of high-tension wires was reported from New Jersey, and by 1929, 1,000 installations had been made in the United States and Europe. The majority of power line communication installations use transmissions in the longwave band, to avoid interference to and from standard AM stations.

Home entertainment services

United States
In 1923, the Wired Radio Service Company, a subsidiary of the local electric company, set up a subscription news and entertainment service at Staten Island, New York that used carrier current transmissions over the electrical power lines. To receive the transmissions, subscribers had to lease a receiver costing between two and five dollars a month. However, despite the power company's optimism that the system would eventually be installed nationally, the effort proved unable to compete with the free offerings provided by standard radio stations. General Squier continued to unsuccessfully promote the technology for home entertainment, until 1934, when he helped found the Muzak company, which focused on the business market.

Europe

Carrier current home entertainment services would prove to be more popular in Europe. Previously, there had been a few successful telephone newspaper services, which sent entertainment to subscribers over standard telephone lines. However, carrier current transmissions had the ability to provide programs over telephone lines without affecting the regular telephone service, and could also send multiple programs simultaneously.

In Germany, the carrier current service was called Drahtfunk, and in Switzerland Telefonrundspruch. In the Soviet Union, this approach was very common beginning in the 1930s because of its low cost and accessibility, and because it made reception of uncensored over-the-air transmissions more difficult. In Norway radiation from power lines was used, provided by the Linjesender facility. In Britain such systems were used for a time in areas where reception from conventional BBC radio transmitters was poor.

In these systems programs were fed by special transformers into the lines. To prevent uncontrolled propagation, filters for the service's carrier frequencies were installed in substations and at line branches. Systems using telephone wires were incompatible with ISDN which required the same bandwidth to transmit digital data. Although the Swiss and German systems have been discontinued, the Italian :it:Filodiffusione still has several hundred thousand subscribers.

Programs formerly carried by "wire broadcasting" in Switzerland included:
 175 kHz Swiss Radio International
 208 kHz RSR1 "la première" (French)
 241 kHz "classical music"
 274 kHz RSI1 "rete UNO" (Italian)
 307 kHz DRS 1 (German)
 340 kHz "easy music"

Low-power broadcasting stations

Carrier current technology is also used for broadcasting radio programs that can be received over a small area by standard AM radios. This is most often associated with college radio and high school radio, but also has applications for hospital radio stations and at military bases, sports stadiums, convention halls, mental and penal institutions, trailer parks, summer camps, office buildings, and drive-in movie theaters. Transmitters that use carrier current are very simple, making them an effective option for students interested in radio.

Carrier current broadcasting began in 1936, when students at Brown University in Providence, Rhode Island developed a carrier current station initially called "The Brown Network". This station was founded by George Abraham and David W. Borst, who had originally installed an intercom system between their dormitory rooms. The intercom links were first expanded to additional locations, and then the system was replaced by distributed low-powered radio transmitters, which fed their signals into various buildings' electrical wires, allowing nearby radio receivers to receive the transmissions.

The carrier current station idea soon spread to other college campuses, especially in the northeastern United States. The Intercollegiate Broadcasting System (IBS) was formed in February 1940, to coordinate activities between twelve college carrier current stations and to solicit advertisers interested in sponsoring programs geared toward their student audiences. The innovation received a major publicity boost by a complimentary article that appeared in the May 24, 1941 issue of The Saturday Evening Post, and eventually hundreds of college stations were established. Responding to the growing phenomenon, a 1941 release issued by the U.S. Federal Communications Commission (FCC) stated that because of the stations' very limited ranges, it had "not promulgated any rule governing their operation." Therefore, to operate legally, U.S. carrier current station broadcast emissions must adhere to the FCC's Title 47 CFR Part 15 Rules for unlicensed transmissions.

Educational institution carrier current and cablecast stations
Many college stations that went on to obtain FM broadcasting licenses started out as carrier current stations because of the low cost and relative ease of starting one. Although college-based carrier current stations have existed for over 80 years, their numbers are steadily declining, becoming supplemented, or replaced, by other transmission methods, including low-power FM (LPFM), closed circuit over cable TV channels, and Internet streaming audio and video, along with simple PowerPoint presentations of college campus news and information being streamed using low-cost consumer televisions and monitors. As with most other student-run facilities, these stations often operate on sporadic schedules.

In the United States, unlike educational FM stations, carrier current stations can carry a full range of advertising. Due to their low power, these stations do not require an FCC license, and are not assigned an official call sign. However, in keeping with standard radio industry practice, they commonly adopt their own call sign-like identifiers.

Existing stations

Bulls Radio at the University of South Florida in Tampa, Florida; also heard on licensed WMNF-HD2
KAMP at the University of Arizona in Tucson, Arizona
KANM at Texas A&M University in College Station, Texas
KASR at Arizona State University in Tempe, Arizona
KDUP at the University of Portland in Portland, Oregon
KJACK at Northern Arizona University in Flagstaff, Arizona
KLBC at Long Beach City College in Long Beach, California
KMSC "Dragon Radio" at Minnesota State University Moorhead in Moorhead, Minnesota
KRFH at Humboldt State University in Arcata, California
"K-ROCKS RadioOne" ( / ) in Casper, Wyoming
KSSU at California State University, Sacramento in Sacramento, California
KUR ( / ) at Kutztown University of Pennsylvania in Kutztown, Pennsylvania
KUTE at the University of Utah
Radio Laurier Macdonald at Laurier Macdonald High School in Saint-Leonard, Montreal, Quebec, Canada
Radio SNHU at Southern New Hampshire University
Studio U at the University of Oklahoma in Norman, Oklahoma
UMSLRadio "The U" at the University of Missouri–St. Louis in University City, Missouri
WALT at Davidson College in Davidson, North Carolina
WERW at Syracuse University in Syracuse, New York
WGCC at Genesee Community College in Batavia, New York
Wolfpack Radio at the University of Nevada in Reno, Nevada
WPPJ at Point Park University in Pittsburgh, Pennsylvania
WPMD at Cerritos College in Norwalk, California
WQMC at Queens College, City University of New York in Kew Gardens Hills, Queens
WSIN at Southern Connecticut State University in New Haven, Connecticut
WSLU ( / ) at Saint Leo University in St. Leo, Florida
WTBU ( / ) at Boston University in Boston, Massachusetts

Former stations

"Brown Student Radio" at Brown University in Providence, Rhode Island — now WBRU
CBR/WVBR at Cornell University in Ithaca, New York — now WVBR-FM
KASR at Arizona State University in Tempe, Arizona — now internet-only "Blaze Radio"
KCIZ at Mora High School in Mora, Minnesota
"K.C. AM" at Colby College in Waterville, Maine — now WMHB
KAL at the University of California—Berkeley in Berkeley, California — now KALX
KARL-AM at Carleton College in Northfield, Minnesota — now KRLX
KCC at Chabot College in Hayward, California — now KCRH
KCCS at the University of Missouri in Columbia, Missouri — supplanted by KCOU
KCAT at Central Washington State College in Ellensburg, Washington — now KCWU
KDSC/KDSU at North Dakota State University in Fargo, North Dakota — now KDSU
KCD at the University of California—Davis in Davis, California — now KDVS
KFRH at Washington University in St. Louis in St. Louis, Missouri — now KWUR
KHSC at Humboldt State College in Arcata, California — now KHSU
KMPS-AM at University of Alaska Fairbanks in Fairbanks, Alaska — now KSUA
KNAB at Chapman University in Orange, California — now internet-only "ChapmanRadio.com"
KNMA at New Mexico State University in Las Cruces, New Mexico
KOWL at Rice University in Houston, Texas — later KHVU, now KTRU-LP
KRLK at Rio Linda High School in Rio Linda, California — now KRIO
KBIL/KSLU at Saint Louis University in St. Louis, Missouri — now internet-only "KSLU"
KSU at Stanford University in Stanford, California – now KZSU
KSUB at Seattle University in Seattle, Washington — now KXSU-LP
KSWC at Southwestern College in Winfield, Kansas — now KSWC-LP
KUCB at University of Colorado Boulder in Boulder, Colorado — now KVCU
KUOK at University of Kansas in Lawrence, Kansas — now KJHK
KVUC at Union College in Lincoln, Nebraska — now KUCV
MD2/KTTC at Texas Tech College in Lubbock, Texas — now KTXT-FM
"Radio Western" at the University of Western Ontario in London, Ontario, Canada — now CHRW-FM
WAMU at American University in Washington, D.C. — now WAMU
WBAU at Adelphi University in Garden City, New York — became now-defunct station WBAU
WBMB at Baruch College/City University of New York in New York City
WBSC at Bloomsburg State College in Bloomsburg, Pennsylvania — now WHSK
WCAR at University of North Carolina at Chapel Hill — now WXYC
WCCT/WNTC at Clarkson College of Technology/SUNY Potsdam in Potsdam, New York — now WTSC-FM
WCHP and WINO/WRFX at Central Michigan University in Mount Pleasant, Michigan
WCXQ in Isabela, Puerto Rico — now WCXQ-LP
WDBS at Duke University in Durham, North Carolina — now WXDU
WDCR/WESB at the University of Dayton in Dayton, Ohio — now WUDR
WDGN at Downers Grove North High School in Downers Grove, Illinois — now WDGC-FM
WERC at The University of Toledo in Toledo, Ohio — now WXUT
WERU at Embry–Riddle Aeronautical University in Daytona Beach, Florida — now WIKD-LP
WEXP at La Salle University in Philadelphia, Pennsylvania — now internet-only
WFAL at Bowling Green State University in Bowling Green, Ohio — now WFAL Falcon Radio
WFIB at the University of Cincinnati in Cincinnati, Ohio
WFRS at Ferris State College in Big Rapids, Michigan
WFVS at Fort Valley State University in Fort Valley, Georgia — later WFVS-LP, now WFVS-FM
WGBC at State University of New York at Geneseo in Geneseo, New York
WHAT at Johns Hopkins University in Baltimore, Maryland — later WHSR, now WJHU
WHEN/WDRB at the University of Delaware in Newark, Delaware — now WVUD
WHEN at Western Illinois University in Macomb, Illinois — now WIUS
WHRM at Hiram College in Hiram, Ohio — now internet-only "The Bark"
WHUS at University of Connecticut in Storrs, Connecticut — now WHUS
WJHU at Johns Hopkins University in Baltimore, Maryland — now WJHU
WJJC at the John Jay College of Criminal Justice/City University of New York in New York City
WCBN/WJJX at the University of Michigan in Ann Arbor, Michigan — now WCBN-FM
WJPZ at Syracuse University in Syracuse, New York — now WJPZ-FM
WJRH at Lafayette College in Easton, Pennsylvania — now WJRH
WKC at Knox College in Galesburg, Illinois — now WVKC
WKCO at Kenyon College in Gambier, Ohio — now WKCO
WKDT at United States Military Academy in West Point, New York — now internet-only
WMAX/WXDT at Drexel University in Philadelphia, Pennsylvania — now WKDU
WKSR at Kent State University in Kent, Ohio — now internet-only "Black Squirrel Radio"
 WCDW/WLCR at Camp Shaw-Mi-Del-Eca in Lewisburg, West Virginia, operated by summer camp attendees
WHMA/WLHA at University of Wisconsin–Madison in Madison, Wisconsin — now internet-only "Lakeshore 64 WLHA"
WLHD (East Green) and WSGR (South Green) at Ohio University in Athens, Ohio — supplanted by "ACRN: The Rock Lobster", now internet-only
WLKR at Lake Superior State University in Sault Ste. Marie, Michigan — now WLSO
WLRN at Lehigh University in Bethlehem, Pennsylvania
WMAX at Mount Washington College in Manchester, New Hampshire
WMCR at Monmouth College in Monmouth, Illinois 
WMIT at the Massachusetts Institute of Technology in Cambridge, Massachusetts — now WMBR
WMSN at Michigan State University in East Lansing, Michigan; networked with WBRS (Brody Hall), WKME (Shaw Hall), WEAK (Wonders Hall), WMCD (McDonnell Hall), and WFEE (Fee Hall) — supplanted by WDBM
WMUC at University of Maryland, College Park in College Park, Maryland — now WMUC-FM
WNYU at New York University in Lower Manhattan — now WNYU-FM
WOBC at Otterbein College/Otterbein University in Westerville, Ohio - Now WOBN-FM
WOCR, a "pirate" carrier current station in Ocean City, Maryland
WOLF at North Carolina State University in Raleigh, North Carolina — now WKNC-FM
WPSM at Penn State—McKeesport in McKeesport, Pennsylvania — now internet-only "WMKP"
WQAD/WFQR/WIN/WIUS at Indiana University in Bloomington, Indiana — now WIUX-LP
WRAF at Binghamton University in Binghamton, New York — now WHRW
WRCC at Rockland Community College in Ramapo, New York
WRCR at Rockford College in Rockford, Illinois — revived as internet-only in 2011, ceased operations in 2017
WRFX at Central Michigan University in Mount Pleasant, Michigan
WRCT at Carnegie Mellon University in Pittsburgh, Pennsylvania — now WRCT
WRGW at George Washington University in Washington, D.C. — now internet-only
"WRIU Studio B" at University of Rhode Island in Kingston, Rhode Island — now internet-only
WRLC at Rutgers University—Livingston in Piscataway, New Jersey — now WVPH
WRPS at SUNY Potsdam in Potsdam, New York — later WAIH
WRSU at Rutgers University in New Brunswick, New Jersey — now WRSU-FM
WRUC at Union College in Schenectady, New York — now WRUC
WRUR at University of Rochester in Rochester, New York — now WRUR-FM
WSAC at Saint Anselm College in Goffstown, New Hampshire
WSCS/WCUR at West Chester University in West Chester, Pennsylvania — now WCUR
WSMC at St. Mary's College in St. Mary's, Maryland
WSND at the University of Notre Dame in Notre Dame, Indiana — now WSND-FM
WSOE at Milwaukee School of Engineering in Milwaukee, Wisconsin — now WMSE
WSUA at State University of New York at Albany-now WCDB.
WTAS at Hope College in Holland, Michigan — now WTHS
WTGR at Memphis State University in Memphis, Tennessee — now WYXR
WTMC at the Boston Housing Authority's Bromley-Heath Housing Project in Jamaica Plain, Massachusetts
WUFI at Florida International University in Miami, Florida —now WRGP
WUVA at University of Virginia in Charlottesville, Virginia — now WCVL-FM
WUVT at Virginia Tech in Blacksburg, Virginia — now WUVT-FM
WVAT at SUNY Alfred State in Alfred, New York — later WETD
WVAU at American University in Washington, D.C. — now internet-only
WVBU at Bucknell University in Lewisburg, Pennsylvania — now WVBU-FM
WVCW at Virginia Commonwealth University in Richmond, Virginia — now WVCW
WVOF at Fairfield University in Fairfield, Connecticut — now WVOF
WVRW at Michigan Technological University in Houghton, Michigan — now WMTU-FM
 WVYC at York College of Pennsylvania in York, Pennsylvania — now WVYC
WWRC at Rider College in Lawrenceville, New Jersey — now WRRC
WWSU at Wright State University in Dayton, Ohio
WVW/WOUX/WOU at Oakland University in Rochester Hills, Michigan — now WXOU
WXPN and WQHS at the University of Pennsylvania in Philadelphia, Pennsylvania — now WXPN and internet-only "WQHS Radio"
WYBC at Yale University in New Haven, Connecticut — supplanted by an unrelated WYBC (AM) in 1998

See also
Power-line communication
Leaky feeder

References

Further reading

External links
Carrier Current Broadcasting Theory by LPB

Broadcast engineering
Radio technology